Smyrna is a town in Kent and New Castle counties in the U.S. state of Delaware. It is part of the Dover, Delaware Metropolitan Statistical Area. According to the Census Bureau, as of 2010, the population of the town is 10,023.

The international jurist John Bassett Moore was born in Smyrna, as were politicians Louis McLane and James Williams.

History

Smyrna was originally called Duck Creek Cross Roads and received its current name in 1806 after the Greek seaport of Smyrna in present-day Turkey. The town was located along the north–south King's Highway. Smyrna was originally a shipping center along the Duck Creek and was the most important port between Wilmington and Lewes, shipping grain, lumber, tanbark, and produce to points north. After the shipping industry collapsed in the 1850s, the town would continue to be an agricultural center.

Another account of Smyrna's name goes back to the Second Great Awakening of 1806–1807 when Methodist preacher Frances Asbury preached a sermon on the Church at Smyrna from Revelation 2 to the local Methodist society.  The sermon was so well received that the residents changed the name of the town to Smyrna in honor of the sermon.

The Bannister Hall and Baynard House, Belmont Hall, David J. Cummins House, Timothy Cummins House, Duck Creek Village, George Farmhouse, Ivy Dale Farm, Mount Pleasant, Moore House, Peterson and Mustard's Hermitage Farm, Savin-Wilson House, Short's Landing Hotel Complex, Smyrna Historic District, John M. Voshell House, and Woodlawn are listed on the National Register of Historic Places.

Geography

Climate
The climate in this area is characterized by hot, humid summers and generally mild to cool winters. According to the Köppen Climate Classification system, Smyrna has a humid subtropical climate, abbreviated "Cfa" on climate maps.

<div style="width:65%">

</div style>

Government
Smyrna is governed by a mayor and a six-member council. As of 2019, the mayor of Smyrna is Robert Johnson. The Smyrna Town Council consists of:
Valerie Forbes (District 3/Vice Mayor)
Margaret Mann (District 2)
William Pressley Sr. (At-large/Secretary)
Michael Rasmussen (At-large)
Tabitha Gott (District 1)
Gerald Brown (At-large)

Infrastructure

Transportation

The Delaware Route 1 toll road is the most prominent highway serving Smyrna. It passes along the eastern edge of the town, with access provided at Exit 114 (South Smyrna) and Exit 119 (North Smyrna), both connecting to US 13. U.S. Route 13 is the main north–south road through Smyrna, passing through the town on Dupont Boulevard. The Smyrna Rest Area is located north of Smyrna at the junction of US 13 and DE 1 at Exit 119. US 13 and DE 1 both run south to Dover and north to Wilmington. Delaware Route 6 runs east–west through Smyrna, heading west to Clayton and Blackiston and east to Woodland Beach. Delaware Route 300 begins at US 13 and heads west along with DE 6 through Smyrna before splitting to the southwest and heading toward Kenton. DART First State provides bus service to Smyrna along Route 120, which provides local service south to Dover and connects to the local bus routes serving the Dover area; Route 301, which provides express service south to Dover and north to Wilmington from the Smyrna Rest Area; and Route 302, which provides service south to Dover and north to Middletown and Newark from the Smyrna Rest Area. Smyrna Airport, a general aviation airport, is located to the east of Smyrna.

Utilities
The Town of Smyrna Electric Department provides electricity to Smyrna, serving about 6,200 customers. The town's electric department is a member of the Delaware Municipal Electric Corporation, a wholesale electric utility that purchases energy for its members. Trash collection in the town is provided under contract by Waste Industries. The Public Works department provides water and sewer service to about 4,000 customers in Smyrna. Natural gas service in Smyrna is provided by Chesapeake Utilities.

Health care
Bayhealth Medical Center operates the Bayhealth Emergency Center, Smyrna in Smyrna. The emergency center offers a 24-hour emergency department.

Demographics

As of the census of 2000, there were 5,679 people, 2,114 households, and 1,462 families residing in the town. The racial makeup of the town was 72.88% White, 22.42% African American, 0.51% Native American, 0.56% Asian, 0.07% Pacific Islander, 1.44% from other races, and 2.11% from two or more races. Hispanic or Latino of any race were 3.42% of the population.

There were 2,114 households, out of which 36.7% had children under the age of 18 living with them, 45.9% were married couples living together, 18.4% had a female householder with no husband present, and 30.8% were non-families. 24.9% of all households were made up of individuals, and 10.4% had someone living alone who was 65 years of age or older.  The average household size was 2.56 and the average family size was 3.02.

In the town, the population was spread out, with 27.1% under the age of 18, 8.7% from 18 to 24, 29.1% from 25 to 44, 18.3% from 45 to 64, and 16.9% who were 65 years of age or older.  The median age was 35 years. For every 100 females, there were 82.7 males.  For every 100 females age 18 and over, there were 77.0 males.

The median income for a household in the town was $36,212, and the median income for a family was $42,355. Males had a median income of $32,500 versus $22,135 for females. The per capita income for the town was $17,443.  About 7.9% of families and 10.5% of the population were below the poverty line, including 14.0% of those under age 18 and 6.2% of those age 65 or over.

Notable people 
 Jacob M. Appel (born 1973), author, wrote The Topless Widow of Herkimer Street while living in Smyrna
 Billy Bailey (1947–1996), convicted murderer, last person (as of April 2022) to be hanged in US (1996)
 Edward G. Budd, founder of Budd Company
George D. Cummins, founder and first Bishop of the Reformed Episcopal Church
Carl E. Grammer (1858-1944), Evangelical Episcopal priest and author
 John Bassett Moore, international lawyer, 23rd Assistant United States Secretary of State
 Robert J. Reynolds, 47th Governor of Delaware
 Michael Scuse, acting United States Secretary of Agriculture
 Presley Spruance, United States Senator of Delaware 1847–1853
 Chuck Wicks, country music singer and Dancing with the Stars contestant
 John B. Mayberry, Congressional Medal of Honor Recipient for actions at the Battle Of Gettysburg
 John H. Hoffecker, United States Congressman for Delaware
 Walter O. Hoffecker United States Congressman for Delaware
 Levin I. Handy, United States Congressman for Delaware
 John Cook, sixth President of Delaware (1782–1783)  [Some Governors were referred to as "Presidents" of their state prior to the ratification of the Constitution which established the U.S. Presidency]
 Thomas Collins, 8th President of Delaware (1786–1789) [Some Governors were referred to as "Presidents" of their state prior to the ratification of the Constitution which established the U.S. Presidency]
 John Clark, 20th Governor of Delaware
 William Temple, 35th Governor of Delaware (1846–1847) [Youngest Governor in Delaware's history at 32], United States Congressman for Delaware (1863–1863 died in office)
 James Williams, United States Congressman for Delaware (1875–1879)
 Roosevelt Wardell, acclaimed jazz pianist who recorded with Sam Jones and Louis Hayes

References

External links

 Town of Smyrna

Towns in Kent County, Delaware
Towns in New Castle County, Delaware
Towns in Delaware